At least two ships of the Brazilian Navy have borne the name Apa

 , an  launched in 1945 and stricken in 1964
 , an  launched in 2010 as Scarborough for the Trinidad and Tobago Coastguard she was acquired by Brazil in 2012

Brazilian Navy ship names